The CONCACAF qualifiers for the 2019 World Beach Games, known officially as the 2019 World Beach Games – Qualifier El Salvador, was a beach soccer tournament contested by North American national teams who are members of CONCACAF that took place to determine the nations from North, Central America and the Caribbean that qualified to the beach soccer competition at the inaugural edition of the ANOC World Beach Games.

The tournament consisted of two events: the men's qualifiers and the women's qualifiers, the former a knockout competition from which the top two teams qualified, and the latter a round robin contest from which the top two teams also qualified.

Organised by Beach Soccer Worldwide (BSWW), National Sports Institute of El Salvador (INDES) and Salvadoran Football Federation (FESFUT), the competition took place in San Salvador, El Salvador from 3–5 August 2019.

Mexico claimed the crown in both the men's and women's events.

Venues
For both the men's and women's tournaments, a beach soccer pitch installed at the International Centre of Fairs and Conventions (CIFCO) in the city of San Salvador, El Salvador was used to host all matches, with a capacity of 5,000.

Men's tournament

Teams 
The men's event was an eight-team tournament. The entrants are listed below, ordered by their world ranking (June 2019) in parentheses:

Draw
The draw took place internally with most details undisclosed. Teams were organised based on their position in the world ranking in a similar vein to that of the European qualifiers (the hosts were drawn against the team ranked eighth, the best ranked team against the team ranked seventh, second against sixth and fourth against fifth.)

Results
The competition was played as a straight knockout tournament, starting with the quarter-finals and ending with the final with the winner crowned champions of the event. Meanwhile, the losing nations of each round receded to play in a series of consolation matches in order to determine all final placements.

The two teams that reached the final qualified for the 2019 World Beach Games.

Matches are listed as local time in San Salvador, (UTC–6).

Awards

Winners trophy

Individual awards

Final standings

Source: El Grafico

Women's tournament

Teams
Four teams entered the women's event which are as follows:

Results
The competition was played as a single round robin tournament; the teams competed to earn points for the overall standings table – the two that accumulated the most points after all the matches were completed qualified for the 2019 World Beach Games.

Matches are listed as local time in San Salvador, (UTC–6).

Awards

Winners trophy

Individual awards

See also
2019 FIFA Beach Soccer World Cup qualification (CONCACAF)

References

External links
World Beach Games - Qualifier El Salvador 2019, at Beach Soccer Worldwide
World Beach Games 2019 – Qualifying Tournament – Central America, at Beach Soccer Russia (in Russian)

World Beach Games
2019
2019
August 2019 sports events in North America
2019 in Salvadoran sport